Jack Vees (born 1955) is an American composer and bassist from Camden, New Jersey.

Biography
Both a performer (electric bass/guitar and electronics) and a composer, Vees has written music for his own ensemble, Chez Vees, and for groups such as Ensemble Modern, California EAR Unit, and Zeitgeist (ensemble). He has collaborated with performers Ashley Bathgate, Libby Van Cleve, Amy Knoles, Jeffrey Krieger, and Ben Verdery, as well as various choreographers and video artists. Influences include Louis Andriessen, John Cage, George Crumb, Charles Ives, Erik Satie, Joel Thome, and Captain Beefheart (Don Van Vliet).

Vees holds an undergraduate degree from Glassboro State College and an M.F.A. from California Institute of the Arts. Previous composition teachers include Louis Andriessen, Vinko Globokar, Stephen L. Mosko, Bernard Rands, and Morton Subotnick.

Vees currently resides in Guilford, Connecticut with his wife Libby Van Cleve. He is the operations director and instructor of the Center of Studies in Music Technology at the Yale School of Music.

Notable compositions

Solo (with or without electronics) 
National Anthem (2000) for guitar and electronics

Surf Music Again (1996) for guitar and electronics

Rocket Baby (1994) for electric cello and midi cellos

Apocrypha (1986) for oboe and electronic tape

John Henry (1984) for bass guitar

Small ensemble 
Piano Trio (Hulk Smash!) (1994) for three players on two pianos

Tattooed Barbie (1991) for 12-string guitar, oboe, and computer

Saints Before the Vanishing Point (1990) for small ensemble

Colorized Chaplin (1989) for electric guitar and harpsichord

Child Bride (1988) for cello, electronics, and midi

Theatrical works / opera / multimedia 
Feynman (2003-2005), chamber opera

Piece for Composition (1987) for multimedia and percussion

Discography 
2001: Ben Verdery – Soe-Pa. CD Baby.
 Strummage
2000: The Restaurant Behind the Pier. Recommended Records.
 The Restaurant Behind the Pier
 John Henry
 Monsiur Piñata
 Surf Music II
1998: Emergency Music. Composers Recordings, Inc.
 Prom Face Devotion
1997: Surf Music Again. Composers Recordings, Inc.
 Tattooed Barbie
 Stigmata non Grata
 Piano Trio
 Rocket Baby Electric
 Piano Trio (Hulk Smash!)
 SPNFL
 Surf Music Again

Publications 
The Book on Bass Harmonics. Alfred Music Publishers. 1981.

References 

21st-century American composers
1955 births
Living people
Musicians from Camden, New Jersey